Wilhelm Falk (3 July 1898 – 16 October 1961) was a German international footballer.

References

1898 births
1961 deaths
Association football defenders
German footballers
Germany international footballers